Rybinsky District is the name of several administrative and municipal districts in Russia:
Rybinsky District, Krasnoyarsk Krai, an administrative and municipal district of Krasnoyarsk Krai
Rybinsky District, Yaroslavl Oblast, an administrative and municipal district of Yaroslavl Oblast

References